Longus, sometimes Longos, was the author of an ancient Greek novel or romance, Daphnis and Chloe.  Nothing is known of his life; it is assumed that he lived on the isle of Lesbos (setting for Daphnis and Chloe) during the 2nd century AD.

It has been suggested that the name Longus is merely a misinterpretation of the first word of Daphnis and Chloe'''s title Λεσβιακῶν ἐρωτικῶν λόγοι ("story of a Lesbian romance", "Lesbian" for "from Lesbos island") in the Florentine manuscript; EE Seiler observes that the best manuscript begins and ends with λόγου (not λόγγου) ποιμενικῶν''. 

If his name was really Longus, he was possibly a freedman of some Roman family which bore that name as a cognomen.

See also
Other ancient Greek novelists:
 Chariton - The Loves of Chaereas and Callirhoe
 Xenophon of Ephesus - The Ephesian Tale
 Achilles Tatius - Leucippe and Clitophon
 Heliodorus of Emesa - The Aethiopica

References

External links

 
 
 
 Longus at the Bibliotheca Augustana 

Ancient Greek novelists
2nd-century writers
Year of birth unknown
Year of death unknown
People from ancient Lesbos